Norman William Couper (2 August 1916 – 28 February 1997) was an  Australian rules footballer who played with South Melbourne in the Victorian Football League (VFL).

Notes

External links 

1916 births
1997 deaths
Australian rules footballers from Victoria (Australia)
Sydney Swans players
Australian Army personnel of World War II
Australian Army soldiers
People from Cardinia